Brigitte Millar is an English actress. She is mostly known for playing alongside Daniel Craig and Christoph Waltz in Spectre.   She is a descendant of Emil Nolde.

Career
In 2011, Millar was awarded Best Supporting Actress for her role in the British feature film David is Dying.

In 2014, Millar was one of the supporting roles of The Quiet Hour with Dakota Blue Richards, which was nominated for Best UK Feature at the 22nd Raindance Film Festival. Millar portrayed SPECTRE's Dr. Vogel alongside Daniel Craig and Christoph Waltz in Spectre the following year.

In 2018, Millar played alongside Matt Passmore in the short film Nox directed by Keyvan Sheikhalishahi.

Filmography

Films

Television

References

21st-century English actresses
Actresses from London
English film actresses
English television actresses
Living people
Year of birth missing (living people)